MV Empire MacKay was an oil tanker constructed with rudimentary aircraft handling facilities as a merchant aircraft carrier (MAC ship).

MV Empire MacKay was built by Harland and Wolff, Govan under order from the Ministry of War Transport. She entered service as a MAC ship in October 1943, however only her air crew and the necessary maintenance staff were naval personnel.  She was operated by the British Tanker Company.

She returned to merchant service as an oil tanker in 1946 as British Swordfish and she was eventually scrapped in Rotterdam in 1959.

References

External links
 FAA Archive 

Oil tankers
Empire MacKay
Empire ships
1943 ships
Ships built in Govan
Ships built by Harland and Wolff